Brendan Callaghan SJ (born 29 July 1948) is a psychologist of religion who was Master of Campion Hall, Oxford 2008–2013. 
He holds an MA (oxon) from Oxford, an MPhil from Glasgow University and an MTh from the University of London. Fr Callaghan is also a Chartered Clinical Psychologist.

He was Principal of Heythrop College, London 1985–1997.
He has served as superior of the Manchester Jesuit community.

Publications
Kenneth Boyd, Brendan Callaghan, and Edward Shotter, Life before birth: a search for consensus on abortion and the treatment of infertility (London: SPCK, 1986)

References

1948 births
Living people
Masters of Campion Hall, Oxford
Academics of Heythrop College
Alumni of the University of Glasgow
Alumni of Campion Hall, Oxford
Alumni of Heythrop College
Bioethicists
English people of Irish descent
20th-century English Jesuits
21st-century English Jesuits
Religion academics
20th-century British Roman Catholic theologians
21st-century British Roman Catholic theologians
Place of birth missing (living people)